Manhasset Specialty Company, or Mahasset, is a music stand manufacturing company. The company was founded in 1935 and had its headquarters in Yakima, Washington. The music stands are known for their simple black colour and appearance in schools, churches, and performance halls.

Description 
The Manhasset Specialty Company was founded in 1935 by inventor and musician, Otto Lagervall who was dissatisfied with the quality of the existing music stands and their inherent problems and shortcomings. He set out to develop a better music stand and succeeded in developing the initial Manhasset music stands. At the time of the company's founding, Otto lived in Manhasset, New York, hence the company's name. During the early 1940s, Otto moved the company to Yakima, Washington, where it is still located.

References 

Music equipment manufacturers
Manufacturing companies based in Washington (state)